Melanopyge is a Neotropical genus of firetips in the family Hesperiidae.

Species
Melanopyge cossea (Druce, 1875) cossea skipper - Colombia  
Melanopyge erythrosticta (Godman & Salvin, 1879)  spotted skipper - southeast Mexico to Panama  
Melanopyge hoffmanni (Freeman, 1977) Hoffmann's skipper - southeast Mexico, Belize
Melanopyge maculosa (Hewitson, 1866) maculosa skipper - Panama, Colombia, Ecuador, Venezuela 
Melanopyge mulleri (Bell, 1934) red-spotted skipper - southeast  Mexico

References
Natural History Museum Lepidoptera genus database

Hesperiidae
Hesperiidae of South America
Hesperiidae genera